"For Reasons Unknown" is a song by American rock band The Killers and was written by lead vocalist Brandon Flowers. It is the fifth track on their second studio album Sam's Town, released in October 2006. The song was released as the fourth single from the album in the United Kingdom on June 25, 2007, and also the fourth and final North American single.

Bassist Mark Stoermer plays guitar on this track, with Flowers playing the bass.

Background
The B-sides are a cover of Dire Straits' "Romeo and Juliet" and an acoustic version of "Sam's Town" both recorded live at Abbey Road Studios for the Channel 4 show Live from Abbey Road, and later featured on their compilation album Sawdust.  "For Reasons Unknown"  also appeared  on their 2013 compilation album Direct Hits. Similarly to Sam's Town, the cover art features a Desert bighorn sheep, the state mammal of Nevada, where the Killers are from.

Reception

Critical
The song received positive reviews from music critics. Billboard said of the track, "this synth-free rocker opens with ominous multitrack vocals and grinding fuzz guitars and builds to a huge pop chorus as Flowers dances on the edge of a relentlessly pumped groove."

Music video
The video was premiered in the UK on May 18, 2007 and was shown on the International Music Feed and MTV Two as well as various other UK music channels. The video was shot in black-and-white, and has already premiered on MuchMusic in Canada.

Chart performance
It became one of their lowest charting singles in the UK to date, peaking at #53 on July 1, 2007, spending only one week in the UK Top 75. This song was #78 on MTV Asia's list of the Top 100 Hits of 2007. Singer Brandon Flowers has stated that they did not "promote" the single like previous ones, stating four singles for the album was too much, and said he wished they hadn't released Bones as a single.

Track listing
UK CD:
 "For Reasons Unknown" – 3:31
 "Romeo and Juliet" (Live at Abbey Road Studios) – 5:25

UK 7":
 "For Reasons Unknown" – 3:31
 "Sam's Town" (Live at Abbey Road Studios) – 3:45

Charts

References

The Killers songs
2006 songs
2007 singles
Song recordings produced by Alan Moulder
Song recordings produced by Flood (producer)
Songs written by Brandon Flowers
Rock ballads
Music videos directed by Diane Martel
Mercury Records singles
Island Records singles
Black-and-white music videos